Ana Sofia Pereira Serrenho Reboleira (born October 6, 1980, in Caldas da Rainha) is a Portuguese biologist and speleologist, best known for her discovery of over 70 species of flora and fauna, and the description of 17 new taxa, and for her exploration work at the Krubera Cave.

References 

1980 births
Living people
Portuguese biologists
Speleologists